A Dutch flower bucket is the most common container used in the European floral industry to transport flowers, and to keep them watered in transit.

Overview
It is a patented design from Royal FloraHolland, a Dutch conglomerate of florists. The bucket is made of hard plastic, and is stackable.  There are three main sizes.

All flowers exported by truck from the Netherlands to the main continental European countries and the United Kingdom are delivered to customers via Dutch buckets stored on trolleys. The bucket is only temporarily borrowed, and an inventory of quantities delivered to each shop is kept. The bucket is expected to be collected empty by the truck driver on the return voyage. If not returned a fee is charged.

Opposite to other shipping devices, such as pallets and TEU containers, the Dutch bucket is not considered a unit of measurement, and flowers are not sold or purchased based on quantities of buckets delivered. The European network of flower shops have benefited from the usage of a common container tool, and the Dutch bucket has been considered a "standard" since the early 2000s.

See also
 Flower delivery
 Flowerpot
 Royal FloraHolland
 Cut flowers
 Dutch auction
 Intermediate bulk container
 Bulk box

References

Containers
Vessels
Floral industry
Floristry
Modularity
Freight transport